Moravice (formerly known as Komorske Moravice until 1919, thereafter as Srpske Moravice until 1991) is a settlement in north-western Croatia, situated at the far east of the mountainous region of Gorski kotar in the Primorje-Gorski Kotar County. It is part of the Vrbovsko municipality. The population is 664 (as of the 2011 census).

History 
The Vlachs were settled in Moravice 1585 on the proposal general of Karlovac Josip Turn. Vlachs were Slavic shepherds or foreigners who were settled through Statuta Vlachorum on this territory.

Demographics

Notable natives and residents
 Danilo Jakšić - 18th century Serb Orthodox bishop
 Slavko Kvaternik - one of the founders of the Ustaša movement, and a Nazi collaborator during the Second World War
 Pero Kvrgić - actor 
 Đorđe Petrović - painter
 Vasilije Matić - forestry expert
 Đorđe Kangrga - musician 
 Snježana Pejčić - Olympic athlete

References

Populated places in Primorje-Gorski Kotar County
Serb communities in Croatia